Mahmoud Karimi (born May 9, 1978) is a retired Iranian football striker who played for Sepahan in Iran Pro League and currently is Sepahan's assistant manager.

Karimi's full name is Mahmoud Karimi Sibaki, and he is from Sibak, a Georgian town in Fereydunshahr county. He is the most famous Iranian Georgian footballer in Iran.
His most memorable performance dates to the semifinals of the 2007 Hazfi Cup, when he scored a hat-trick in the second overtime period against Persepolis F.C. to give Sepahan a 4-1 win.

On July 17, 2009 Karimi announced his retirement from playing club football due to nagging injuries.

Club career statistics 

1 includes 2 matches and 1 goal in FIFA Club World Cup 2007.

Honours
Sepahan
 Iran Pro League
Winners (1): 2002–03
Runner Up (1): 2007–08

Hazfi Cup
Winners (3): 2003–04, 2005–06, 2006–07

Asian Champions League
Runner Up (1): 2007

References

Iran Pro League Stats

Iranian footballers
Association football forwards
Persian Gulf Pro League players
Azadegan League players
Sepahan S.C. footballers
Iranian people of Georgian descent
1978 births
Living people